Nada is an unincorporated community in Colorado County, Texas, United States. It is located on State Highway 71 approximately midway between El Campo and Columbus. According to the Handbook of Texas, the community had an estimated population of 165 in 2000.

Geography

History
The original name of the community was Vox Populi (Latin for "Voice of the People"). The present name is an Americanized version of the Czech word "naděje," meaning "hope." The first settlers were J. William Schoellmann and his family, who arrived in the area on February 15, 1881. Many of the early settlers that followed were Czechs and Germans from the Frelsburg area. The first church in Nada was dedicated on October 7, 1897 and a schoolhouse was constructed in 1899 that housed eighteen students. By the mid-1980s, the population was estimated at 165. It remained at that level through 2000.

Nada has a post office with the ZIP code 77460.

Education
Public education in the community of Nada is provided by the Rice Consolidated Independent School District.

In 1948, Nada's school district became part of the Garwood Independent School District, which merged with several other districts in 1970 to form the Rice Consolidated Independent School District.

Notable people
 Roman Catholic bishop Hugo Mark Gerbermann was born in Nada.
 Roman Catholic Bishop Bernard Ferdinand Popp was born in Nada.

References

External links
 
 

Czech-American culture in Texas
German-American culture in Texas
Unincorporated communities in Colorado County, Texas
Unincorporated communities in Texas